The 1926 French Grand Prix was a Grand Prix motor race held at the Circuit of Miramas on 27 June 1926.

It was the second race of the 1926 AIACR World Manufacturers' Championship season. Unfortunately for the spectators, of all the cars that were announced to participate in the race, only three Bugattis started. In the end there was just one car that managed to complete the full race distance; the Bugatti of Jules Goux.

Classification

References

French Grand Prix
French Grand Prix
1926 in French motorsport